Triglochin muelleri  is a species of flowering plant in the family Juncaginaceae, first described by Franz Georg Philipp Buchenau in 1903, and native to Western Australia and South Australia.

It is a tufted annual herb growing from 0.05-0.2 m high, in salt lakes, swamps and  places that are wet in winter. It flowers from September to November.

References

External links
Triglochin muelleri occurrence data from the Australasian Virtual Herbarium

Juncaginaceae
Flora of Western Australia
Flora of South Australia
Plants described in 1903